Alan Martín Cantero (born 28 June 1998) is an Argentine professional footballer who plays as a centre-forward for Estudiantes BA, on loan from Godoy Cruz.

Career
Cantero came through the youth ranks at Sportivo Peñarol. He was promoted into the Torneo Federal B club's senior set-up in 2016, making his debut in the local league at the age of eighteen. They won promotion from the newly created Torneo Regional Federal Amateur in 2019, with Cantero scoring twice in a 2–1 win over Independiente de Chivilcoy in a promotion play-off final. In Torneo Federal A, the centre-forward netted league goals against Estudiantes, Huracán Las Heras, Sol de Mayo, Sportivo Desamparados and Olimpo before the season's curtailment; he also scored a brace over Desamparados in the Copa Argentina.

In June 2020, Cantero departed Sportivo Peñarol at the expiration of his contract and subsequently joined Primera División side Godoy Cruz. After going unused on the substitute's bench against River Plate a month prior, he made his debut on 14 December during a Copa de la Liga Profesional draw away to Central Córdoba; replacing Tomás Badaloni with eleven minutes left.

In February 2022, Cantero joined Primera Nacional club Estudiantes de Buenos Aires on a loan deal until the end of the year.

Career statistics
.

Notes

References

External links

1998 births
Living people
People from San Juan, Argentina
Argentine footballers
Association football forwards
Torneo Federal A players
Argentine Primera División players
Primera Nacional players
Godoy Cruz Antonio Tomba footballers
Estudiantes de Buenos Aires footballers
Sportspeople from San Juan Province, Argentina